Jacopo d'Antonio Sansovino (2 July 1486 – 27 November 1570) was an Italian Renaissance sculptor and architect, best known for his works around the Piazza San Marco in Venice. These are crucial works in the history of Venetian Renaissance architecture.  Andrea Palladio, in the Preface to his Quattro Libri was of the opinion that Sansovino's Biblioteca Marciana was the best building erected since Antiquity. Giorgio Vasari uniquely printed his Vita of Sansovino separately.

Biography
He was born in Florence and apprenticed with Andrea Sansovino, whose name he subsequently adopted, changing his name from Jacopo Tatti.

In Rome he attracted the notice of Bramante and Raphael and made a wax model of the Deposition of Christ for Perugino to use.

He returned to Florence in 1511 where he received commissions for marble sculptures of St. James for the Duomo and a Bacchus, now in the Bargello. His proposals for sculpture to adorn the façade of the Church of San Lorenzo, however, were rejected by Michelangelo, who was in charge of the scheme, to whom he wrote a bitter letter of protest in 1518.

In the period of 1510-17 he shared a studio with the painter Andrea del Sarto, with whom he shared models. Like all sixteenth-century Italian architects, Sansovino devoted considerable energy to elaborate temporary structures related to courtly ceremonies and festivities. The triumphal entry of Pope Leo X into Florence in 1515 was a highpoint of this genre. He subsequently returned to Rome where he stayed for nine years, leaving for Venice in the year of the Sack of Rome.

Career
In 1529, Sansovino became chief architect and superintendent of properties (Protomaestro or Proto) to the Procurators of San Marco, making him one of the most influential artists in Venice. The appointment came with a salary of 80 ducats and an apartment near the clocktower in San Marco. Within a year his salary was raised to 180 ducats per year.

His main achievements are a group of prominent structures and buildings in central Venice found near Piazza San Marco, specifically the rusticated Zecca (public mint), the highly decorated Loggetta and its sculptures adjoining the Campanile, and various statues and reliefs for the Basilica of San Marco. He also helped rebuild a number of buildings, churches, palaces, and institutional buildings including the churches of San Zulian, San Francesco della Vigna, San Martino, San Geminiano (now destroyed), Santo Spirito in Isola, and the church of the Incurabili. Among palaces and buildings are the Scuola Grande della Misericordia (early plans), Ca' de Dio, Palazzo Dolfin Manin, Palazzo Corner, Palazzo Moro, and the Fabbriche Nuove di Rialto.

His masterpiece is the Library of Saint Mark's, the Biblioteca Marciana, one of Venice's most richly decorated Renaissance structures, which stands in front of the Doge's palace, across the piazzetta. Construction spanned fifty years and cost over 30,000 ducats. In it he successfully made the architectural language of classicism, traditionally associated with severity and restraint, palatable to the Venetians with their love of surface decoration. This paved the way for the graceful architecture of Andrea Palladio.

He died in Venice and his tomb is in the Baptistery of St. Mark's Basilica. His most important follower in the medium of sculpture was Alessandro Vittoria; another disciple was the architect and sculptor Danese Cataneo.

Gallery

See also
Renaissance Classicism

References

Further reading
Boucher, Bruce. The Sculpture of Jacopo Sansovino. 2 vols. (New Haven: Yale University Press) 1991. Monograph and catalogue raisonné of the sculpture.
Tafuri, Manfredo (Jessica Levine, translator). Venice and the Renaissance. (Cambridge MA: MIT Press) (1985) 1989. Sansovino's cultural context.
Deborah Howard. Jacopo Sansovino Architecture and Patronage in Renaissance Venice. Yale University Press 1975.
 Jacopo Sansovino | Italian sculptor | Britannica
 Hart, Vaughan, Hicks, Peter, Sansovino's Venice (New Haven: Yale University Press) 2017.

Jacopo Sansovino
Italian Renaissance architects
Italian Renaissance sculptors
1486 births
1570 deaths
Architects from Florence
Sculptors from Florence
16th-century people of the Republic of Florence
16th-century Italian architects
16th-century Italian sculptors
Italian male sculptors
Catholic sculptors